Foulis is a castle.

Foulis may also refer to:

G. T. Foulis, part of Haynes Publishing Group
Foulis baronets, three separate baronetcies in the Baronetage of England and on the Baronetage of Nova Scotia

People with the surname
David Foulis (disambiguation)
Henry Foulis (1638–1669), English academic theologian and author
Robert Foulis (disambiguation)
Thomas Foulis (fl. 1580–1628), Scottish goldsmith and financier

See also